Calliostoma pyrron is a species of sea snail, a marine gastropod mollusk, in the family Calliostomatidae within the superfamily Trochoidea, the top snails, turban snails and their allies.

Distribution
This marine species occurs in the following locations:
 Madagascar
 Mozambique Channel

References

pyrron